William Wightman (c.1335 – 1404, 1405 or 1406) was a yeoman and English MP for the constituency of Huntingdon between 1361 and 1391.

He is most notable for having a long uninterrupted service in the House, despite the volatility of the period.

Personal life
He married Agnes in February 1383.

References

1330s births
English MPs 1361
1400s deaths
English MPs 1365
English MPs 1366
English MPs 1369
English MPs 1371
English MPs 1372
English MPs 1373
English MPs 1376
English MPs January 1377
English MPs October 1377
English MPs 1378
English MPs January 1380
English MPs 1381
English MPs May 1382
English MPs October 1382
English MPs October 1383
English MPs April 1384
English MPs November 1384
English MPs February 1388
English MPs September 1388
English MPs January 1390
English MPs 1391